Bujan or Boojan may refer to:
 Bujan, Hamadan
 Bujan, Kerman
 Bujan, Tehran